This page lists nationwide public opinion polls that have been conducted relating to the 2013 presidential elections in the Czech Republic.

Opinion polls for the first round

First round

Second round

Acceptability of candidates

Media survey

First round

Second round

Other voting

References

Opinion polling for presidential elections in the Czech Republic
2013 Czech presidential election